Leonard Cyrus Church (January 31, 1846 – December 7, 1915) was an American businessman, farmer, and politician.

Church was born in the town of Walworth, Walworth County, Wisconsin and went to the public schools and to  Allen's Grove Academy in Allen's Grove, Wisconsin. Church served in the 3rd Wisconsin Volunteer Cavalry Regiment, Company L during the American Civil War. He was a dairy farmer and cattle dealer. Church was also involved in the banking and lumber business. Church served the Walworth County treasurer and was a Republican. He served in the Wisconsin Assembly in 1897 and 1898. Church died at the Sacred Heart Sanitarium in Milwaukee, Wisconsin from a heart ailment.

Notes

External links

Leonard C. Church in History of Walworth County, Wisconsin

1846 births
1915 deaths
People from Walworth, Wisconsin
People of Wisconsin in the American Civil War
Businesspeople from Wisconsin
Farmers from Wisconsin
County officials in Wisconsin
Republican Party members of the Wisconsin State Assembly